Goodenia hederacea, commonly known as forest goodenia or ivy goodenia, is a species of flowering plant that is endemic to eastern Australia. It is a prostrate to ascending, perennial herb with linear to elliptic or round leaves, and racemes of yellow flowers.

Description

Taxonomy
Goodenia hederacea was first formally described by English botanist James Edward Smith in 1794 in Transactions of the Linnean Society of London.

In 1912, Kurt Krause described the variety alpestris in Engler's journal Das Pflanzenreich and in 1990, Roger Charles Carolin raised the variety to subspecies status in the journal Telopea. The name is accepted by the Australian Plant Census along with the autonym subsp. hederacea:
Goodenia hederacea subsp. alpestris (K.Krause) Carolin; 
Goodenia hederacea Sm.  subsp. hederacea. 

Distribution and habitat
Forest goodenia usually grows in forest on a variety of soils, from south-east Queensland to Victoria. Subspecies alpestris grows in subalpine grassland and woodland south from Kiandra in New South Wales to the higher parts of the eastern ranges of Victoria.

Conservation status
Goodenia hederacea subsp. hederacea is classified as of "least concern" in Queensland by the Queensland Department of Environment and Science, under the Nature Conservation Act 1992.

Use in horticulture
In cultivation, the species prefers a situation in part shade and with some moisture. It copes with a range of soil types and tolerates frost and snow.

References

External links
 Image of seed: Goodenia hederacea. Australian Plant Image Index, Australian National Botanic Gardens, Australian National Herbarium.

hederacea
Flora of New South Wales
Flora of Queensland
Flora of Victoria (Australia)
Asterales of Australia
Taxa named by James Edward Smith
Plants described in 1794